The State Arboretum of Utah is an arboretum located across the campus of the University of Utah in Salt Lake City, Utah, as well as on an additional site at Red Butte Garden and Arboretum. The campus grounds and the Red Butte Garden are open to the public every day. The conservatory is open by appointment only.

The State Arboretum was established in 1961. It now contains over 8,000 trees (300 species and varieties, including over 200 taxa of conifers). The arboretum's conservatory contains over 400 exotic taxa. Red Butte Garden and Arboretum contains more than 1,500 conifers.

See also
 Red Butte Garden and Arboretum
 List of botanical gardens in the United States
 Utah Native Plant Society

References

Arboreta in Utah
Botanical gardens in Utah
University of Utah
Geography of Salt Lake City
Protected areas of Salt Lake County, Utah
Tourist attractions in Salt Lake City
1961 establishments in Utah